Van Gogh and Britain is an exhibition of Vincent van Gogh's paintings that was hosted by Tate Britain between 27 March and 11 August 2019.

Exhibition 
The exhibition was held at Tate Britain between 27 March and 11 August 2019. It covered Van Gogh's impact on British painters and his connection with Britain when he was working as a trainee art dealer in London between 1873 and 1876 - such as with the novels of Charles Dickens and George Eliot, as well as paintings by John Constable and John Everett Millais. It also covered British artists inspired by Van Gogh, including Francis Bacon, David Bomberg and the Camden Town Group.

The museum's previous Van Gogh exhibition took place in 1947, which lasted 5 weeks with over 157,000 visitors, including the Queen, and was sponsored by the Arts Council of Great Britain. The attendance of the exhibition was so high that the Tate subsequently requested reimbursement for 3 years worth of wear-and-tear on its flooring during the 5 weeks of the exhibition from the Arts Council. Half of the visitors were during the weekend, when exhibition entry was free, while the other half attended during the week, paying a shilling each, totaling £3,000.

Entrance to the exhibition cost £22, with a concession rate of £20.

Paintings in the exhibition

References 

Tate galleries
Vincent van Gogh